Thibaut Vargas (born 22 May 2000) is a French professional footballer who plays as a right-back for  club Nîmes.

Career
Vargas signed his first professional contract with Montpellier on 20 December 2019. He made his professional debut with the club in a 5–0 Coupe de France win over Caen on 19 January 2020.

In June 2022, Vargas signed a one-year contract with Nîmes, with an option to extend for two more years.

References

External links
 
 LFP Profile

2000 births
Living people
French people of Spanish descent
Sportspeople from Aix-en-Provence
French footballers
Footballers from Provence-Alpes-Côte d'Azur
Association football midfielders
Ligue 1 players
Ligue 2 players
Championnat National 2 players
Championnat National 3 players
Championnat National players
Montpellier HSC players
LB Châteauroux players
Nîmes Olympique players